The Shire of Phillip Island was a local government area in Western Port Bay, about  south of Melbourne, the state capital of Victoria, Australia.

History

Phillip Island was initially incorporated as part of the Phillip Island Road District on 8 September 1871, which was, however, based on the mainland. This district became the Shire of Phillip Island and Woolamai on 24 December 1874. A severance movement was successful in creating a separate Shire of Phillip Island on 18 September 1928, with the remainder ultimately becoming the Shire of Bass.

On 2 December 1994, the Shire of Phillip Island was abolished, and along with the Borough of Wonthaggi and the Shire of Bass, and parts of the City of Cranbourne and the Shires of Korumburra and Woorayl, was merged into the newly created Bass Coast Shire.

Ridings
The Shire of Phillip Island had nine councillors, each of whom represented the entire shire.

Towns and localities
 Cape Woolamai
 Churchill Island
 Cowes*
 Newhaven
 Rhyll
 Silverleaves
 Smiths Beach
 Summerlands
 Sunderland Bay
 Surf Beach
 Ventnor
 Wimbledon Heights

* Council seat.

Population

* Estimate in the 1958 Victorian Year Book.

References

External links
 Victorian Places - Phillip Island

Phillip Island